Jared Francisco Borgetti Echavarría (born 14 August 1973) is a Mexican former professional footballer who currently works as a commentator for ESPN Deportes and ESPN Mexico.

As a player, Borgetti was known as a prolific goal scorer at both club and national level, and was renowned for his heading ability. With 46 goals, Borgetti is the second all-time leading goal scorer (behind Javier Hernández) of the Selección de fútbol de México. He is the Santos Laguna top goal scorer with 205 goals. He was popularly known by the nickname of El Zorro del Desierto ("The Desert Fox") in reference to his debut team, Atlas, and his birthplace.

Club career

Santos Laguna 
Borgetti began his club career with Atlas in the Primera División de México on 6 March 1994, debuting in a 3–1 loss to Club América. After two successful seasons, he signed with Santos Laguna, where he claimed three golden boot titles for most goals in the season in his seven-year participation with club. With Santos, he won two league championships. Borgetti later signed a one-year contract with promoted team Dorados de Sinaloa, where he stated he wanted to play in his home team, before joining Pachuca, at the latter where he had little activity due to the qualifying games for the World Cup.

Bolton Wanderers
On 4 August 2005, Borgetti signed a two-year deal with English club Bolton Wanderers for a fee of around £1 million. He became the first Mexican to play for an English club.

He made his official English debut in a 2–0 Premier League win over Newcastle United twenty days after signing, and scored his first goal for the club during Bolton's UEFA Cup tie against Lokomotiv Plovdiv on 15 September, scoring again in the competition against Besiktas on 20 October. He went on to score in the FA Cup against Watford and in the League Cup against West Ham and Leicester City. Having also scored two league goals against Manchester City and Charlton Athletic, Borgetti ended the season with seven goals in all competitions.

Al-Ittihad 
After the 2005–06 season, Borgetti was released by Bolton. He eventually signed with Saudi Arabian club Al-Ittihad. He made his debut on 9 September 2006, scoring two goals in a 3–2 victory over Saudi team Al-Ta'ee. In December 2006, Borgetti left Al-Ittihad. Teams from the leagues of France, England, and Spain showed interest in signing the player.

Cruz Azul
In mid-December 2006, Santos Laguna showed interest in signing Borgetti and Francisco Fonseca, but unfortunately, days later, Club América signed Vicente Matias Vuoso on loan to Santos. Borgetti and Fonseca turned down the club's offer and later announced that he would return to Mexico as a member of Cruz Azul under a one-year contract. In 2007, Borgetti was called upon by Hugo Sánchez to represent Mexico in a series of international friendly matches and tournaments. His jersey number was 58.

C.F. Monterrey
On 21 December 2007, it was officially announced that Borgetti would play for Monterrey for the next six months in the Mexico Clausura 2008 tournament. Borgetti scored his first goal with the Rayados in the Clásico Regiomontano against Tigres UANL, where Tigres won 3–2.

Guadalajara
Starting on 14 January 2009, Borgetti played for Guadalajara for six months. He was brought especially to play in the 2009 Copa Libertadores. He always stated that he had accomplished one of his dreams as a footballer, to be on a team where all of the players were Mexican-born and to be on a team with the most championships in the Primera División. Borgetti played seven games in the Torneo Clausura 2009 as a starter and six as a sub, barely recording 220 minutes for the club. In the Copa Libertadores, he played six out of the six games, three as a starter and three as a sub, playing a total of 366 minutes. Shortly after the season ended Borgetti was let go along with other newly recruited teammates due to the club's disappointing season.

Puebla
Since his departure from Guadalajara, Borgetti has gone on to sign with Puebla as of 13 June 2009 in time for the Apertura 2009 Tournament. In a pre-season game, Borgetti suffered a broken ribcage and had to sit out for the first four weeks of the Apertura Tournament. He scored his first goal on 9 August 2009 against Querétaro. He continued his good form by scoring a header on 22 August 2009, in a 2–1 win against Pachuca. At the end of the season Borgetti left the club to pursue another team. He decided to go back to Mexico with his family and friends.

Morelia
On 27 December 2009 signed a one-year contract with Monarcas Morelia. On 13 February 2010 he scored his first goal with Monarcas Morelia and 249th in Mexico league soccer. That same goal tied him for 3rd top goal scorer in Mexico league history with José Saturnino Cardozo. On 24 April 2010, he scored his 250th goal, giving him the sole possession of the 3rd position in the top goal scorers of the Mexico League, passing Jose Cardozo who played for Toluca and scored 249 goals.

León
After his departure from Morelia, Borgetti was considering retirement, but after getting an agreement with Club León, he played for the team in Mexico's Liga de Ascenso in the fall of 2010. After failing to make it to the play-offs he was released from his contract. On 5 December 2010, he announced his retirement from professional football.

International career

On the international stage, Borgetti first played with Mexico on 5 February 1997 against Ecuador. He would not make his mark internationally, however, until the qualification campaign for the 2002 FIFA World Cup began in late 2000. After the qualification campaign proved successful for Mexico, Borgetti became a regular starter within the squad and went on to score goals for his country at the 2001 Copa América, the 2002 World Cup, and the 2004 Copa América.

Borgetti's most successful tournament was the 2005 FIFA Confederations Cup. He scored three goals against Brazil and Germany and helped Mexico to a fourth-place finish. He also had to retake a penalty twice against Brazil due to various infractions. It was blocked on the third attempt, but he later scored the winning goal that resulted in a 1–0 upset.

On 25 March 2007, Borgetti came off the bench, replacing Omar Bravo in a match against Paraguay. Borgetti scored two goals within three minutes. On 8 June 2007, Borgetti played in the 2007 CONCACAF Gold Cup, scoring two goals. He also scored a goal in the quarter-finals against Costa Rica. In the final against the United States, Borgetti injured himself, and could not participate in the 2007 Copa América, where the Mexico national team reached the third place in the competition against Brazil and Argentina, beating Uruguay in the third place game of the Copa América.

Personal life
Borgetti is of Italian descent through his grandfather, who migrated from Cuneo, Piedmont, to Sinaloa. Due to this, he was able to get an Italian passport, though Borgetti has stated that this was solely for the purpose of playing football in England. Allowing him to be a EU-member player and not a foreign player.

Career statistics

Club

International

Honours
Santos Laguna
Mexican Primera División: 1996, 2001

Mexico
CONCACAF Gold Cup: 2003

Individual
Mexican Primera División Golden Ball: Invierno 2000, Verano 2001
Mexican Primera División Forward of the Season: Invierno 2000, Verano 2001
CONCACAF FIFA World Cup qualification Top Scorer: 2006
IFFHS Second Best Scorer of First Division: 2001 
All-time Top Scorer of Santos Laguna: 205 goals

References

External links
 International statistics at RSSSF
 Football Database Player Information, Honours, Career Stats, Timeline
 
 

1973 births
Living people
People from Culiacán Municipality
Footballers from Sinaloa
Mexican people of Italian descent
Mexican people of Basque descent
Association football forwards
Mexican footballers
Mexico international footballers
2001 Copa América players
2002 FIFA World Cup players
2003 CONCACAF Gold Cup players
2004 Copa América players
2005 FIFA Confederations Cup players
2005 CONCACAF Gold Cup players
2006 FIFA World Cup players
2007 CONCACAF Gold Cup players
CONCACAF Gold Cup-winning players
Atlas F.C. footballers
Santos Laguna footballers
Dorados de Sinaloa footballers
C.F. Pachuca players
Bolton Wanderers F.C. players
Ittihad FC players
Cruz Azul footballers
C.F. Monterrey players
C.D. Guadalajara footballers
Club Puebla players
Atlético Morelia players
Club León footballers
Liga MX players
Premier League players
Saudi Professional League players
Mexican expatriate footballers
Expatriate footballers in England
Mexican expatriate sportspeople in England
Expatriate footballers in Saudi Arabia
Mexican expatriate sportspeople in Saudi Arabia